"The Three Snake-Leaves" (German: Die drei Schlangenblätter) is a German fairy tale collected by the Brothers Grimm, tale number 16. It is Aarne-Thompson type 612, "The Three Snake-Leaves".

Synopsis

Via his valor in battle, a young man wins the king's daughter to wife, but has to agree to an unusual demand from the princess: if either of them should die, the other will be buried alive with the former.

Sometime later, the princess falls sick and dies, so the prince is buried alive in her crypt. While waiting to starve to death, the prince is attacked by a snake, which he kills by chopping into three pieces. Another snake revives the dead snake with three leaves, giving the prince the idea to use the leaves on the princess, successfully reviving her.

The prince and princess then take a sea voyage to visit his father. The princess falls in love with the ship captain, and the pair throws the prince into the sea and drown him. A servant rows after the prince's body, and he revives him using the snake leaves. The prince and the servant return to the kingdom and report the murder attempt, for which the princess and the captain are executed.

Analysis
Austrian consul Johann Georg von Hahn noted the motif of the resurrection by the herb or plant a snake brought to revive its mate echoes the Greek tale of Polyidus and Glaucus.

Professor  indicated its parallel in Greek tradition, but also pointed that the motif of the animal reviving its mate with a plant can be found in the poem Eliduc by Marie de France.

Hans-Jörg Uther noted literary predecessors in the Indian Panchatantra, in Apollodorus and in Hyginus.

See also

Joseph (Genesis)
Hans My Hedgehog
Tale of Two Brothers
Chariton

References

External links

 "The Three Snake-Leaves" on About.com
 "The Three Snake-Leaves" on ClassicReader.com

Grimms' Fairy Tales
ATU 560-649